Ratchayothin Yotharuck (born 13 December 1995 in Nakhon Nayok, Thailand) is a Thai former professional snooker player. Yotharuck has been playing snooker since he was 10 years old and represented Thailand in several international events together with Boonrayit Kiatkul and Noppon Saengkham. In 2013 he received a two-year wildcard for the Main Tour as an Asian Confederation of Billiard Sports nomination, after Asian champion Saleh Mohammad declined his place.

Career
Having missed the first few events of the 2013–14 season, Yotharuck made his debut at the Rotterdam Open, where he lost 4–1 to Mitchell Travis in pre-qualifying. Yotharuck would lose all three of his first round matches in the ranking events, with the exception coming at the Indian Open. There he caused an upset by defeating former world champion Graeme Dott 4–2 in qualifying and went on to beat his famous compatriot James Wattana 4–3 at the venue, before being whitewashed in the last 32 match by Mike Dunn. He finished his debut season ranked world number 111.

Yotharuck lost nine of his ten matches during the 2014–15 season and has not played in an event since December 2014. He lost his place on the tour at the end of the season as he was the world number 110.

Performance and rankings timeline

Career finals

Amateur finals: 1

References

External links

 

1995 births
Living people
Ratchayothin Yotharuck
Ratchayothin Yotharuck
Southeast Asian Games medalists in cue sports
Competitors at the 2015 Southeast Asian Games
Ratchayothin Yotharuck
Ratchayothin Yotharuck